Riesel High School is a public high school located in Riesel, Texas (USA) and classified as a 3A school by the UIL. It is part of the Riesel Independent School District located in southeastern McLennan County.  In 2015, the school was rated "Met Standard" by the Texas Education Agency.

Athletics

The Riesel Indians compete in these sports - 

Baseball
Basketball
Cross Country
Football
Golf
Powerlifting
Softball
Track and Field

Rivalries

Riesel fans and residents have long enjoyed a strong rivalry with the neighboring Mart Panthers, a campus located less than ten miles away on F.M. 1860.

Activities
Riesel offers the following extra-curricular activities - Cheerleading, Dance, FFA, One Act Play

References

External links
Riesel ISD

High schools in Central Texas
Schools in McLennan County, Texas
Public high schools in Texas
Public middle schools in Texas